The 2019–20 Basketligaen is the 45th season of the highest professional basketball tier in Denmark. The season started on 22 September 2019 and was scheduled to end on 13 May 2020. On 17 March 2020, the season was ended prematurely because of the COVID-19 pandemic. Based on the standings at that time, the Bakken Bears were named Danish champions, defending its title.

Competition format
Teams were divided into two groups: Pro A, joined by the best five teams in the previous season, and Pro B, the rest of the teams. Each team was scheduled to play four times against each other team in their group, and twice with teams from the other group.

The five teams of Pro A and the best three of Pro B qualified for playoffs.

Teams

Amager joined the league after an absence of nine years.

Regular season

Pro A

Pro B

Results

Playoffs
The playoffs were not played as all games were cancelled in March.

Danish clubs in European competitions

References

External links
Official Basketligaen website

Basketligaen seasons
Danish
Basketball
Basketball
Basketligaen